Peter John Arundell (8 November 1933 – 16 June 2009) was a British racing driver from England, who raced in Formula One for Team Lotus. He participated in 13 World Championship Grands Prix, scoring 12 championship points.

Born in Ilford, Essex, Arundell became a professional racing driver after finishing his time in the Royal Air Force, competing in Elva and Lotus cars. He won an early Formula Junior race held in England, the John Davy Trophy at the Boxing Day Brands Hatch meeting in an Elva-D.K.W. in 1959. In 1962 he won the British Formula Junior championship in a Lotus 22, and also in 1963 in a Lotus 27. He also won the Monaco Formula Junior race in 1961 and 1962. He won the last Formula Junior race held in England, the Anglo-European Formula Junior Trophy, also at Brands Hatch, in September 1963, in a Lotus 27-Ford.

He marked his arrival in the Formula One World Championship in 1964 with two podium finishes. He was regarded as a strong prospect for the future and a great supporting driver for World Champion Jim Clark.

In 1964, while racing in Formula Two at Reims-Gueux, he had a spin and was hit at high speed by Richie Ginther; Arundell was thrown from the car in the impact, which resulted in him missing most of the 1965 season. Lotus boss Colin Chapman saved his place in the team for 1966, with Arundell finishing third on his comeback in the non-championship South African Grand Prix at East London on 1 January 1966. He did not enjoy any great success and at the end of that year he retired from Formula One, having started only 11 races.

He retired from racing altogether in 1969, and later moved to Florida, where he set up a software company.

Racing record

Complete Formula One World Championship results
(key) (Races in bold indicate pole position)
(Races in italics indicate fastest lap)

Non-Championship Formula One results
(key) (Races in bold indicate pole position)
(Races in italics indicate fastest lap)

 1 Following problems with his own car, Jim Clark took over Arundell's car but then ran out of fuel.
 2 The engine in Jim Clark's Lotus 43 blew up during practice and Clark took over Arundell's car.

Complete British Saloon Car Championship results
(key) (Races in bold indicate pole position; races in italics indicate fastest lap.)

† Events with 2 races staged for the different classes.

References

1933 births
2009 deaths
Deaths from pulmonary fibrosis
English Formula One drivers
English racing drivers
Team Lotus Formula One drivers
People from Ilford
Sportspeople from Essex
British Touring Car Championship drivers